Vulcan, in comics, may refer to:

 Vulcan (DC Comics) is the name of several characters published by DC Comics, one of whom featured in Son of Vulcan
Marvel Comics characters:
 Vulcan (Marvel Comics), a character who is the brother of X-Men members Cyclops and Havok
 Vulcan, another name for the Marvel Comics character Hephaestus (Marvel Comics)
 Vulcan, an enemy of Black Goliath
 Vulcan, a member of First Line
 Vulcan, a character from Charlton Comics, who has also appeared in Son of Vulcan
 Vulcan, a character from Fawcett Comics
 Vulcan (Fleetway), a British comic
 Vulcan, a character from Avatar Press

It may also refer to:
Vulcann, a character from X-Men 2099
Vulcanus, a DC Comics character who has appeared in Batman and the Outsiders

See also
Vulcan (disambiguation)

References